Martin Kulha (born August 7, 1976) is a Slovak professional ice hockey player who currently plays with Sangliers Arvernes de Clermont in the FFHG Division 1.

Kulha had previously played in the Slovak Extraliga with HK Poprad, HC Slovan Bratislava and HK 36 Skalica

References

External links

1976 births
Living people
HC Berkut players
Boxers de Bordeaux players
HSC Csíkszereda players
HC Slovan Bratislava players
HK Poprad players
HK 36 Skalica players
Slovak ice hockey left wingers
Sportspeople from Poprad
MsHK Žilina players
Slovak expatriate sportspeople in Romania
Expatriate ice hockey players in Romania
Slovak expatriate sportspeople in France
Expatriate ice hockey players in France
Slovak expatriate ice hockey people